The First Time is a 2012 American teen romantic comedy film written and directed by Jon Kasdan, starring Britt Robertson, Dylan O'Brien (in his film debut), James Frecheville, and Victoria Justice.

Dave Hodgman (O'Brien) is a high school senior who spends most of his time pining away over his best friend, Jane Harmon (Justice), a girl he cannot have. Aubrey Miller (Robertson), a junior at a different high school, has an older boyfriend, Ronny (Frecheville) who does not quite understand her or seem to care. A casual conversation between Dave and Aubrey sparks an instant connection, and, over the course of a weekend, things turn magical, romantic, complicated, and funny as Aubrey and Dave discover what it is like to fall in love for the first time.

Plot

High school senior Dave meets junior Aubrey just outside a house party, while rehearsing a confession of love for his best friend Jane. Practicing it on her, she is unimpressed. Dave gets her to dance, right before a police raid. 

Aubrey invites Dave to walk her home, although she has a boyfriend. Inviting him to her room, they have wine and meaningful conversation. Aubrey asks him if he's ever had sex, so he admits he hasn't, but she won't answer. Side by side on the floor, they accidentally fall asleep. The next morning, Aubrey's mother wakes them knocking, so Dave sneaks out the window.

Dave meets with his friends, cocky Simon and quiet Big Corporation, for breakfast in a diner. Telling them about Aubrey, they say she may not really have a boyfriend, so suggest he call. Dave tells her that he and his friends are catching a movie that evening, and Aubrey will be there with her boyfriend Ronny too.

Jane and her friends are also at the theatre. Aubrey persuades Ronny to go to the same movie as Dave and Jane, as she is feeling jealous. Jane constantly flirts with Dave inside the theater, and attempts to hold his hand. Confused and upset, Aubrey goes to the lobby during the film, and Dave follows her. She apologizes for being strange earlier and making him jump off the roof. Dave gets her cell number and invites her and Ronny to a quiet gathering afterwards.

Later on, Aubrey and Jane talk together at the pool about Dave. She sees Jane has high praise for him, but doesn't appreciate him. Aubrey almost suggests that sometimes the right guy is right in front of them, but stops and 'forgets' what she was saying.

Meanwhile, a drunk Ronny brags that he and Aubrey are planning to have sex that night in his van. Upset, Dave finds Aubrey and tells her not to do it as her first time should be with someone special. She denounces the romantic notion of the first time being so important, and tells him it's none of his business. They start flirting but Ronny appears, telling Aubrey they need to go. Dave intercedes, nearly fighting before his buddies intervene. Aubrey leaves with Ronny.

At the end of the party, Dave is in a bedroom with Jane, where she first flirts before complaining about her latest sexual misadventures. She notes that he's off, he realizes he'd rather be with Aubrey and leaves. Getting a text from Aubrey asking him to pick her up, he happily obliges. 

As Dave and Aubrey cruise, she tells him she's just dumped Ronny. They then pass the aftermath of an accident, the same van of the teens who'd offered them a ride right after they'd met. Greatly upsetting Aubrey, Dave pulls over. They realise their mutual feelings, and end up kissing.

They meet at a park with Dave's little sister Stella the next day. As Aubrey's parents are out she invites Dave over. He struggles before deciding not to bring a condom. As they make out, they hesitate before deciding to have sex. Dave awkwardly puts on a condom Aubrey gives him, and the scene fades out.

Afterwards, both are upset as it hasn't gone well, and they don't know how to talk about it. Everything they say makes it worse, and they say it was a mistake and should not see each other. They both immediately regret it. Aubrey keeps hoping Dave will call, while he repeatedly picks up his phone to call but backs down while still in his car. 

Meeting with Simon and Big Corporation, he tells them the idea of sex was better than the reality. Simon tells him its no big deal, but Big Corporation reminds him that he finally found someone special. Dave and Aubrey just hit a speed bump because it was their first time, but they should try again.

The following morning, Aubrey tells her parents that she pushed away a great guy, and they try to soothe her. Dave is waiting for her in the driveway, declares his feelings and wants to try again. She acts uninterested, but asks for a ride. In the car, she agrees they should try again and work on the sex, and he is relieved. As he drops her off, they say goodbye awkwardly, but she runs back, breaking her rule with a warm, passionate, public kiss.

Cast

Music

Reception
Review aggregator Rotten Tomatoes gives the film a 47% rating based on 19 reviews and an average rating of 5.62/10. Metacritic gives the film a score of 55 out of 100, based on 10 critics, indicating "mixed or average reviews". Among the negative reviews, Mark Olsen of the Los Angeles Times wrote, "There is much to like here, a sense of nuance and non-judgmental emotional openness, yet Kasdan's teenage miniaturism never quite blooms," whilst Joshua Rothkopf of Time Out New York said, "Writer-director Jonathan Kasdan can't even bother to satisfy the buildup with a real moment of consummation (welcome to the fade to black) or believable postcoital complications." Todd McCarthy of The Hollywood Reporter was similarly unimpressed, remarking, "Despite intermittent laughs and charm, The First Time feels slight and pretty ordinary by the end, with no edge or compelling insights".

However, New York Times critic Neil Genzlinger wrote a positive review, stating, "The list of temptations a filmmaker can fall into when making a movie about high school students and virginity is quite long, but Jonathan Kasdan avoids most of them in his sweet, low-key comedy “The First Time.” No gratuitous raunchiness here and only a few tired caricatures in a genre usually jammed with them." And Daniel Fienberg of HitFix enthused, "The First Time doesn't look or feel like a Sundance competition entry, but if you overlook it due to that television pedigree, you'll miss out on an effectively sweet, frequently clever offering buoyed by an attractive group of stars".

Release
The First Time received a limited release in the United States on October 19, 2012, grossing $22,836 domestically and $92,654 worldwide. It was released on DVD and digital download on March 12, 2013.

References

External links
 
 
 

2012 films
2012 romantic comedy films
2010s coming-of-age comedy films
2010s high school films
2010s teen comedy films
2010s teen romance films
American coming-of-age comedy films
American high school films
American romantic comedy films
American teen comedy films
American teen romance films
Coming-of-age romance films
Films about virginity
Films shot in California
2010s English-language films
2010s American films